Wurdeman may refer to:

 Lake Wurdeman, Glacier National Park, Montana, U.S.
 Wurdeman & Becket, an architectural firm

People with the surname
Charles Wurdeman (1871-1961), American architect 
Walter Wurdeman (1903–1949), American architect